ASCII Media Works is a Japanese publishing company, which has published several manga series in its magazines. It is the result of a merger between ASCII Corporation and MediaWorks.

1990s

1997
Battle Athletes
Kurogane Communication

1998
D4 Princess

1999
Azumanga Daioh

2000s

2000
Dokkoida?!
Kanon
Kokoro Library
Ninin Ga Shinobuden
Train+Train

2001
Comic Party
Gunparade March

2002
Gunslinger Girl
Strawberry Marshmallow

2003
Hayate × Blade
Ichigeki Sacchu!! HoiHoi-san
Junk Force
Muv-Luv
Shingetsutan Tsukihime
Yotsuba&!

2004
Bludgeoning Angel Dokuro-Chan
Blue Drop
Indian Summer
Iono-sama Fanatics
Kagihime Monogatari Eikyū Alice Rondo
Kashimashi: Girl Meets Girl
Muv-Luv Unlimited

2005
Blood Alone
Ef: A Fairy Tale of the Two.
Kemeko Deluxe!
Menacing Dog's
Missing: Kamikakushi
Murder Princess
Shakugan no Shana
Strawberry Panic!
Tsuki wa Higashi ni Hi wa Nishi ni: Operation Sanctuary
Utawarerumono
Venus Versus Virus
Yoake Mae yori Ruriiro na
Yuri Seijin Naoko-san

2006
Bludgeoning Angel Dokuro-chan Ripiru
Lillia and Treize
Little Busters! The 4-koma
Nanatsuiro Drops
Nogizaka Haruka no Himitsu
Shina Dark
Tori Koro

2007
A Certain Scientific Railgun
Clannad
Da Capo II: Imaginary Future
Fortune Arterial Character's Prelude
Gurren Lagann
HoneComi The 4-koma
Ichigeki Sacchu!! HoiHoi-san Legacy
Iriya no Sora, UFO no Natsu
Little Busters!
Lotte no Omocha!
Marriage Royale
Muv-Luv Alternative
My-Otome Saga: Ryū to Otome no Namida
Nanatsuiro Drops Pure!!
Our Home's Fox Deity.
Shakugan no Shana X Eternal song: Harukanaru Uta
Spice and Wolf
Toradora!
Toshokan Sensō Spitfire!
Twinkle Crusaders
Utawarerumono Chiri Yuku Mono e no Komori Uta

2008
Amnesia Labyrinth
Asura Cryin'
Hime Navi/Hime Navi Evolution
Jinki -Shinsetsu-
Ohime-sama Navigation
Puchimas! Petit Idolmaster
S.L.H Stray Love Hearts!
Sharin no Kuni, Himawari no Shōjo
Persona 4World Destruction: Futari no TenshiTwinkle CrusadersUtawarerumonoWhite Album2009Angel Beats! The 4-koma: Bokura no Sensen KōshinkyokuHeavy ObjectHyakka Ryōran: Sengoku MaidensSora Kake Girl DLittle Busters! Ecstasy: Saya Tokido School RevolutionMarriage Royale: Prism StoryMuv-Luv Alternative: Total EclipseOreimoQueen's Blade StruggleTwinkle Crusaders GoGo!Sword Art Online2010s
2010Accel WorldAmagami: Love Goes On!Angel Beats! Heaven's DoorAxel WorldGakuen KinoKud WafterLittle Busters! Ecstasy: Sasami Sasasegawa Black Cat FantasiaLittle Busters! EX The 4-komaŌkami Kakushi: Fukahi no ShōRewrite: Side-BRo-Kyu-Bu!Sound of the SkyUta no☆Prince-sama♪2011Baby PrincessGolden TimeHeavy Object SHorizon in the Middle of NowhereKamikaze Explorer!La storia della Arcana FamigliaLittle Busters! Ecstasy: Kanata Futaki My MinroudLove, Election and ChocolateLove, Election and Chocolate SLCMimic Royal PrincessOre no Kōhai ga Konna ni Kawaii Wake ga NaiThe Pet Girl of SakurasouPhoto Kano: Sweet SnapQualia the PurpleRewrite: Side-RRewrite: Okaken BlogRo-Kyu-Bu! Yonkoma2012Accel World / Dural: Magisa GardenBlack BulletBrothers Conflict PurupuruDa Capo IIIDaitoshokan no HitsujikaiDaitoshokan no Hitsujikai: Lovely LibrariansThe Devil Is a Part-Timer!Guilty Crown: Dancing EndlavesHataraku Maō-sama! High School!Ima Sugu Oniichan ni Imōto da tte Iitai!Kyōkaisen-jō no Horako-sanLittle Busters! Ecstasy HeartfulLittle Busters! End of RefrainLog Horizon Gaiden: Honey Moon LogsLove Live!Mahōka Kōkō no YūtōseiPersona 4: The MagicianPersona x Detective NaotoRo-Kyu-Bu! HalftimeStrike the BloodUta no☆Prince-sama♪DebutVividred Operation: The 4-koma ViviopWaiting in the Summer2013A Certain Scientific AcceleratorAngel Beats! The 4-koma: Osora no Shinda Sekai karaEtotamaKakumei Club Valvra-buKamikaze Explorer!KanColle: Shimakaze Whirlwind GirlNagi-Asu: A Lull in the SeaNagi no Asukara 4-koma Gekijō: NagiyonValvrave the Liberator: Uragiri no RakuinValvrave the Liberator: Ryūsei no ValkyrieVividred Operation2014Buddy ComplexBuddy Complex: Coupling of BattlefieldCelestial MethodGirl Friend (Kari): Chloe Lemarie-hen ~Chole to Nihon to Mirai no Tobira~Girl Friend (Kari): Murakami Fumio-hen ~Secret Smile~Girl Friend (Kari): Sakurai Akane-hen ~Kokoro o Komete, Yūki no On Air!~Girl Friend (Kari) ~Seiō Gakuen Girl's Diary~Girl Friend (Kari): Shiina Kokomi-hen ~Koishite Madonna~KanColle: The perched naval baseLove Live! School Idol DiaryMahōka Kōkō no Rettōsei: Tsuioku-henShirobako: Kaminoyama Kōkō Animation DōkōkaiWashio Sumi wa Yūsha de AruYūki Yūna wa Yūsha-bu ShozokuYūki Yūna wa Yūsha de Aru2015Heavy Object AStar-MuUnsortedFutakoi AlternativeWind: A Breath of Heart''

References

ASCII Media Works
 
ASCII Media Works